The 2009 Vuelta a Andalucía was the 55th edition of the Vuelta a Andalucía cycle race and was held on 15 February to 19 February 2009. The race started in Jaén and finished in Antequera. The race was won by Joost Posthuma.

Teams
Thirteen teams of seven riders started the race:

General classification

References

Vuelta a Andalucia
Vuelta a Andalucía by year
2009 in Spanish sport